"All the Time" is a song by American indie rock band The Strokes. It served as the lead single from their fifth studio album, Comedown Machine and was released as a digital download on February 19, 2013. The song was written by lead singer, Julian Casablancas and bass player, Nikolai Fraiture. The 7" was officially released on April 20, 2013 and contained "Fast Animals" as the B-side.

Track listing

Music video

A music video for "All the Time" was released on 15, March 2013. It is a compilation of footage of the band playing live, taping music videos, and in transit on tour.

Charts

References

External links

The Strokes songs
2013 singles
2013 songs
RCA Records singles
Songs written by Julian Casablancas
Songs written by Nikolai Fraiture